The list below tries to collect the major Hungarian encyclopedias, either independently or in reverse, in chronological order. (Several alphabetical collections have been published as encyclopedias, and are included in this article.) Although most encyclopedias appear in alphabetical order, some biographical collections use chronological order, and ecclesiastical hagiographic biographies (Saints' Life) most often publish biographies in the order of each day of the calendar year.

Latin lexicons in Hungary / Magyarországi régi latin lexikonok 
 List of old latin lexicons in Hungary

Hungarian general lexicons, hand lexicons / Magyar általános nagylexikonok, kézi lexikonok

Hungarian general small lexicons / Magyar általános kislexikonok

Hungarian general biographical lexicons / Magyar általános életrajzi lexikonok

Lists of major Hungarian professional lexicons / Nagyobb magyar szaklexikonok listái 
The following lists try to collect the most important lexicons and lexicon-like encyclopedias in the Hungarian language, either independently or in reverse order, according to fields and within chronological order.

Biology / Biológia

Astronomy, astronautics / Csillagászat, űrhajózás

Electronics, telecommunications / Elektronika, híradástechnika

Photography / Fényképészet

Cinematography / Filmművészet

Philosophy, aesthetics / Filozófia, esztétika

Physics / Fizika

Geography / Földrajz

Genealogy / Genealógia

Military science, police knowledge / Hadtudomány, rendőrségi ismertek

Local history / Helytörténet

Literature / Irodalom

Jurisprudence / Jogtudomány

Chemistry, chemical industry / Kémia, vegyipar

Fine arts, architecture / Képzőművészet, építészet

Communication and Media Science / Kommunikáció- és médiatudomány

Light industry / Könnyűipar

Book publishing / Könyvkiadás

Economics / Közgazdaságtudomány

Transport knowledge / Közlekedés ismeretek

Mathematics / Matematika

Meteorology / Meteorológia

Agricultural science / Mezőgazdaságtan

Museology / Muzeológia

Works of art, literary works / Műalkotások, irodalmi művek

Cultural history / Művelődéstörténet

Ethnography / Néprajz

Linguistics / Nyelvészet

Medicine / Orvostudomány

Pedagogy / Pedagógia

Political science / Politológia

Psychology, sexology / Pszichológia, szexológia

Sports / Sport

Statistics / Statisztikatudomány

Stylistic / Stilisztika

Computer technology / Számítástechnika

Acting / Színművészet

Sociology / Szociológia

Oration doctrine / Szónoklattan

Dance art / Táncművészet

Natural sciences, engineering, technical sciences in general / Természettudományok, mérnöki, műszaki tudományok általában

History / Történelem

Religion, mythology, theology / Vallás, mitológia, teológia

Music / Zene

Lexicon on other topics / Egyéb témakörű lexikonok

References

Sources 
 Kosáry Domokos: Bevezetés Magyarország történetének forrásaiba és irodalmába I., Tankönyvkiadó, Budapest, 1970, 119–123. o.
 Petrik Géza: Magyarország bibliographiája 1712–1860 I–IV., Budapest, 1888–1892 
 Petrik Géza: Jegyzéke az 1860–1875. években megjelent magyar könyvek- és folyóiratoknak, Budapest, 1888–1892 
 Kiszlingstein Sándor: Magyar könyvészet 1876–1885, Budapest, 1890
 Petrik Géza: Magyar Könyvészet 1886–1900. I–II. Az 1886–1900. években megjelent magyar könyvek, térképek és atlaszok összeállítása tudományos szak- és tárgymutatóval. A könyvek betűsoros jegyzéke, térképek és atlaszok, a szerzők névmutatója; Budapest, 1913 
 Petrik Géza – Barcza Imre: Az 1901–1910. években megjelent magyar könyvek, folyóiratok, atlaszok és térképek összeállítása tudományos folyóiratok repertóriumával, Budapest, 1917–1928 
 Kozocsa Sándor: Magyar Könyvészet 1911–1920 (I–II.), Budapest, 1939–1942
 Komjáthy Miklósné (szerk.) – Kertész Gyula (szerk.): Magyar könyvészet 1921–1944. I–XII. – A Magyarországon nyomtatott könyvek szakosított jegyzéke, Országos Széchenyi Könyvtár, 1984–1992

Other external reference 
 Kézikönyvtár | Arcanum

Other articles 
 List of encyclopedias by language

Hungarian
Encyclopedias
Encyclopedias